|}

This is a list of electoral district results for the 1920 Victorian state election.

Results by electoral district

Abbotsford

Albert Park

Allandale

Ballarat East

Ballarat West

Barwon

Benalla 

 John Carlisle was the sitting Nationalist MP for Benalla, but changed to the Victorian Farmers Union before this election.

Benambra

Bendigo East

Bendigo West

Boroondara

Borung

Brighton

Brunswick

Bulla

Carlton

Castlemaine and Maldon

Collingwood

Dalhousie

Dandenong 

 Two party preferred was estimated.

Daylesford

Dundas

Eaglehawk

East Melbourne

Essendon

Evelyn 

|- style="background-color:#E9E9E9"
! colspan="6" style="text-align:left;" |After distribution of preferences

Fitzroy

Flemington

Geelong

Gippsland East

Gippsland North

Gippsland South

Gippsland West

Glenelg

Goulburn Valley

Grenville

Gunbower

Hampden

Hawthorn

Jika Jika

Kara Kara

Korong

Lowan

Maryborough

Melbourne

Mornington 

 Alfred Downward was the sitting Nationalist MP for Mornington, but changed to the Victorian Farmers Union before this election.

North Melbourne

Ovens

Polwarth

Port Fairy

Port Melbourne

Prahran

Richmond

Rodney

St Kilda

Stawell and Ararat

Swan Hill

Toorak

Upper Goulburn

Walhalla

Wangaratta 

 John Bowser was the sitting Nationalist MP for Wangaratta, but changed to the Victorian Farmers Union before this election.

Waranga

Warrenheip

Warrnambool

Williamstown

See also 

 1920 Victorian state election
 Candidates of the 1920 Victorian state election
 Members of the Victorian Legislative Assembly, 1920–1921

References 

Results of Victorian state elections
1920s in Victoria (Australia)